Now and Then is an album recorded by The Rowan Brothers: Chris & Lorin in 2004. It's partly compilation of archive tracks from 1970's, partly newly recorded material.

Track listing 
All compositions by Chris and Lorin Rowan

CD1 - "Now" 

 Circle Of Friends 4:49
 Heart Of A Woman 3:27
 Pathways 4:10
 Burn It On Down 5:22
 Cold War 3:50
 I'll Be There 3:48
 As Much As I Do 3:37
 Arms Of The One I Love 2:51
 Don't Forget 3:50
 Runnin' Wild 2:13
 Lonely Nights 4:09
 Swims With Dolphins 1:00
 How I Think Of You 4:01
 Angelina 5:02
 Childish Love 2:35
 Soldier's Cross 6:35
 Circle Of Friends (Instrumental Reprise) 1:02

CD 2 - "Then" 
 Free 1:21
 Run To The Wind 2:46
 Climbing Up The Mountain 3:20
 Don't You Worry 3:24
 It Grows And Grows 3:46
 Waiting In The Garden 4:04
 All In The Way She Moves 2:54
 Speedway Driver 2:48
 If I Only Could 2:54
 Livin' The Life 3:39
 Guardian Angel 4:47
 Can't Stop Lovin' You 4:12
 Feel The Spirit 3:08
 Peace And Happiness 2:58
 Laura My Love 2:19
 Only You 3:22
 After All Is Said And Done 3:02

Personnel 

CD 1 "Now"

 Chris Rowan - acoustic guitar, piano synthesizer, vocals
 Lorin Rowan - acoustic guitar, electric guitar, mandolin, piano, trilogy bass, vocals
 David Grisman - mandolin (track 1)
 Phil Lesh - bass (tracks 13, 16)
 Richard Greene - fiddle (track 8)
 Barry Sless - steel guitar (tracks 3, 4, 5, 8, 9, 13), electric guitar *(track 16)
 Mookie Siegel - piano/accordion (tracks 3, 4, 5, 10)
 Robin Sylvester - bass (tracks 3, 5, 7, 10, 11)
 Brent Rampone - drums (tracks 3, 5,  10, 11)
 Rob Ickes - dobro (track 6)
 Sally Van Meter - dobro (track 8)
 Doug Harman - cello (tracks 1, 4, 6)
 Bill Amatneek - bass (track 9)
 Eric McCann - drum programming (tracks 13, 16)
 Tim Emmons - bass (tracks 8, 15)
 Dick Bright - violin (track 9)
 James Henry - congas, percussion (track 4)
 Michael Spiro - congas (track 14)   Musicians "Then"

CD 1 "Then"

 Chris Rowan - acoustic guitar, electric guitar, piano, vocals
 Lorin Rowan - acoustic guitar, electric guitar, mandolin, piano, vocals
 Jerry Garcia - pedal steel guitar (track 6)
 Bill Kreutzmann - drums (tracks 3, 6, 14)
 Jim Keltner - drums (track 11)
 Hal Blaine - drums (tracks 7, 8, 15, 17)
 Joe Osborn - bass (tracks 7, 8, 15, 17)
 Bill Elliott - piano (track 11)
 John Douglas - piano (track 12)
 Peter Rowan - background vocals (tracks 7, 8, 17)

References 

2004 albums
The Rowans albums